Joseph Read or Joe Read may refer to:

Joseph Read, soldier
Joseph Read (Canadian politician)
Joe Read, Montana politician

See also
Joseph Reade (disambiguation)
Joseph Reid (disambiguation)
Joseph Reed (disambiguation)